A Bigger Grand Canyon is a 1998 painting by David Hockney consisting of 60 canvases (in a 12x5 arrangement) that produce one large (7.4m-wide) picture. It hangs in the National Gallery of Australia, which bought it for $4.6 million. The Cubist-type painting portrays the Grand Canyon in the
U.S. state of Arizona from many viewpoints and times of day.

Gallery

References

Paintings by David Hockney
1998 paintings
Works about the Grand Canyon
Landscape paintings
Collections of the National Gallery of Australia